Iftikhar Mohmand is a Pakistani politician and member of to Jamiat Ulema-e-Islam (F). He has also served as provincial finance minister of the Khyber Pakhtunkhwa Assembly. Mohamand joined JUI-F in July 2022.

References

Living people
Jamiat Ulema-e-Islam (F) politicians
Year of birth missing (living people)